WANR may refer to:

 WANR (FM), a radio station (88.5 FM) licensed to serve Brewster, New York, United States
 WHTX (AM), a radio station (1570 AM) licensed to serve Warren, Ohio, United States, which held the call sign WANR from 1990 to 2011